Talu Kola (also Romanized as Talū Kolā and Talū Kalā; also known as Tālū Kūlā) is a village in Chahardangeh Rural District, Chahardangeh District, Sari County, Mazandaran Province, Iran. At the 2006 census, its population was 111, in 50 families.

References 

Populated places in Sari County